General elections were held in Mozambique on 15 October 2019. During the leadup to the elections, assassinations and significant intimidation of prominent leaders of opposition parties and election observers were alleged. In addition, State resources, media, and aid for cyclone victims were also alleged to be used in favour of the ruling party (FRELIMO) and its candidates. Local elections observers, civil society organizations, the Commonwealth Observer Group, the European Union Election Observation Mission, and several national and international entities classified the elections as rigged. Nevertheless, the incumbent president Filipe Nyusi of FRELIMO was declared re-elected with 73% of the vote. The main opposition party RENAMO as well as the other oppositions parties involved in the elections contested the results, claiming there were numerous irregularities, and accusing FRELIMO of "massive electoral fraud", including hundreds of thousands of "ghost voters". As evidence for the international community, Ossufo Momade, the president of the main opposition party RENAMO,  transported to Europe a box filled with vote ballots that had been marked in favor of the incumbent president Filipe Nyusi of FRELIMO before the commencement of voting. Despite these occurrences, the international community largely ignored any concerns of fraud, and gradually countries started recognizing the incumbent president Filipe Nyusi of FRELIMO as the winner of the elections.

Electoral system
The President of Mozambique was elected using the two-round system. The 250 members of the Assembly of the Republic were elected by proportional representation in eleven multi-member constituencies based on the country's provinces and on a first-past-the-post basis from two single-member constituencies representing Mozambican citizens in Africa and Europe. Seats in the multi-member constituencies were allocated using the D'Hondt method.

Candidates 
On 16 January 2019, the main opposition party RENAMO held a congress at which Ossufo Momade was elected as the party's new leader and presidential candidate. Momade had been the party's interim president following the death of Afonso Dhlakama in May 2018 and was seen as a "unifying leader" that could bring the political and military sector of RENAMO closer.

The ruling FRELIMO held its congress on 6 May, at which it confirmed its decision to support the re-election of President Filipe Nyussi for a second and final term.

On 9 May and following a three-day congress, the Democratic Movement of Mozambique confirmed that its presidential candidate would be Daviz Simango, mayor of Beira since 2003. Simango was a presidential candidate in the two previous general elections.

On 31 July the Constitutional Council approved four candidates; Nyussi, Momade, Simango and Mário Albino. Two candidates were disqualified; Hélder Mendoça and Alice Mabota. Mabota would have been the first woman to run for president, but failed to collect enough signatures.

FRELIMO nominated Mércia Viriato Licá as one of their candidates. She was elected and became the youngest MP in the country's history.

Results

President

Assembly

Provincial elections

References

Presidential elections in Mozambique
Mozambique
General
Elections in Mozambique
Mozambique